Norah Bigirwa-Nyendwoha (born on 19 October 1968) is a Ugandan politician and woman member of parliament. In 2016, she was elected as a woman representative in parliament for Buliisa district. In the 2021 Uganda general elections, she was re-elected for a similar position.

She is a member of the ruling National Resistance Movement party.

In the eleventh  parliament, Norah serves on the Committee on Foreign Affairs.

Education 
In 1992, Norah completed acquired a diploma in Business Studies at National College of Business Studies located in Nakawa.

In 1995, she acquired an Accounting Technician Certificate from the Uganda Management Institute. The same institute where after 4 years, she got a Finance Officers Diploma.

In 2003, she graduated from Ndejje University with a bachelor's degree of Business Administration in Kampala.

Other responsibilities

See also 

 List of members of the tenth Parliament of Uganda
 List of members of the eleventh Parliament of Uganda
 Member of parliament
 Parliament of Uganda

References

External links 

 Website of the Parliament of Uganda.

Living people
21st-century Ugandan women politicians
21st-century Ugandan politicians
National Resistance Movement politicians
Members of the Parliament of Uganda
Women members of the Parliament of Uganda
1968 births

Ndejje University alumni